The following is a list of countries which Croatia has established diplomatic relations with since the declaration of independence by the Croatian Parliament on 25 June 1991.

History

Croatia and Slovenia declared independence from the SFR Yugoslavia on 25 June 1991. On the next day, the newly independent countries mutually recognised each other. 

At the time of dissolution of Yugoslavia, dissolution of the Soviet Union was happening as well. Ukraine and Baltic states, first of them being Lithuania, recognised Croatia in 1991. However, Ukraine was at the time only partially recognised.

The international community did not immediately recognise the dissolution of Yugoslavia or the independence of its constituent republics, and during 1991 the Croatian War of Independence started.

Two countries that prevailed in diplomatic efforts for the international recognition of Croatia were the Holy See and Germany. Vatican diplomacy, as the world's first, announced on October 3, 1991 that it was working on the Croatian international recognition.

Iceland recognised Croatian independence on 19 December 1991. On the same day, Germany announced its intention to recognise Croatia which was to come into effect on 15 January 1992. Italy, Sweden and the Holy See also announced their intention of recognition. Holy See recognised Croatia on 13 January, and San Marino on 14 January 1992.

On 15 January 1992, Croatia was recognised by all 12 members of the European Economic Community (the predecessor of the European Union) as well as by Austria, Canada, Bulgaria, Hungary, Poland, Malta, Norway and Switzerland. By the end of January 1992, Croatia was recognised by 44 countries. Therefore, 15 January is celebrated in Croatia as the Day of International Recognition.

Russia recognised Croatia in February, Japan in March, the United States in April, and India in May 1992.

At the session of the United Nations General Assembly held on 22 May 1992, which was chaired by Saudi ambassador Sinan Shihabi, Croatia was, alongside Slovenia and Bosnia and Herzegovina, admitted to the membership of the United Nations. Croatia's UN delegation was led by the Croatian President Franjo Tuđman. After a solemn session, United Nations Secretary-General Boutros Boutros Ghali sent delegations from the new UN members states to the main entrance of the UN headquarters, where Croatian, Slovenian and Bosnian-Herzegovinian flags were erected on the masts. Many diplomats and thousands of Croatian emigrants attended flag hoisting ceremony.

By 31 December 1995, Croatia was recognised by 124 countries. On 9 September 1995, Croatia and FR Yugoslavia concluded a Mutual Reconciliation Agreement which included mutual recognition, and established diplomatic relations on 23 August 1996. Among them are all G20 member states that recognized Croatia.

Chronology
Chronological review of countries having established diplomatic relations with Croatia:

No relations
Sovereign states which do not maintain diplomatic relations with Croatia:

See also
Foreign relations of Croatia

References

Foreign relations of Croatia